Helena Eriksson (born 1962) is a Swedish poet. Her sixth collection of poetry, Strata (2004), was published in English in 2014.

Biography
Born in Nyköping, Eriksson was raised in the countryside. After graduating in philosophy and art at Gothenburg University, she worked as an editor for the cultural journal Ord & Bild. She has also worked as a translator. In 1990, she completed her first lyrical collection, Byggnad åt mig (A Building for Me). Her dramatic expressionist poems, written in prose, evoke animal and human worlds which are also depicted in later works. Spott ur en änglamun (Spitting Out of an Angel's Mouth, 1993) depicts a strange fairytale world seen through the eyes of little girls in red dresses who meet Bambi and Fox. She frequently introduces allusions to violence, desire and rupture, sometimes emphasized by the sensuous tactile effects of necklaces and clothing, as in Strata. As a literary translator, she has rendered into Swedish classic texts by women writers, including Anaïs Nin’s House of Incest, Giannina Braschi’s Empire of Dreams (poetry collection), Eileen Myles’ Chelsea Girls, and United States of Banana, and Marguerite Duras' Le Navire Night.

Works
 En byggnad åt mig - 1990
 Spott ur en änglamun - 1993
 Mark - 1996
 Tholos - 1998
 Skäran - 2001
 Strata - 2004 (in English 2014)
 De, bara - 2008
 Logiska undersökningar - 2009
 Mellan eller En annan närhet - 2011
 Täthetsteoremet - 2012

Awards
Eriksson has won several awards including the Swedish Radio Poetry Prize (Sveriges Radios Lyrikpris) in 2008 and the Swedish Academy's Dobloug Prize in 2009. She won the 2019 Swedish Academy's prize for her literary translation of Eileen Myles’s works.

References

1962 births
Living people
Swedish women poets
Swedish translators
People from Nyköping Municipality
20th-century Swedish women writers
21st-century Swedish women writers
20th-century translators
20th-century Swedish poets